Pissi may refer to several settlements in Burkina Faso:

Pissi, Kombissiri, a village in Kombissiri Department, Bazèga Province
Pissi, Saponé, a village in Saponé Department, Bazèga Province

Pissi, Bam, a village in Zimtenga Department, Bam Province
Pissi, Ganzourgou, a village in Zam Department, Ganzourgou Province
Pissi, Gnagna, a village in Bilanga Department, Gnagna Province
Pissi-Zaoce, a village in Gounghin Department, Kouritenga Province